Turinsky (masculine), Turinskaya (feminine), or Turinskoye (neuter) may refer to:
Turinsky District, a district of Sverdlovsk Oblast, Russia
Turinsky Urban Okrug, the municipal formation which this district is incorporated as
Turinsky (rural locality), a rural locality (a settlement) in Tyumen Oblast, Russia